Benjamin Ivry is an American writer on the arts, broadcaster and translator.

Ivry is author of biographies of Francis Poulenc, Arthur Rimbaud, and Maurice Ravel, as well as a poetry collection, Paradise for the Portuguese Queen. The latter contains poems that first appeared in, among other places, The New Yorker, the London Review of Books, The Spectator, Ambit Magazine, and The New Republic.

He has also translated books from the French by authors such as André Gide, Jules Verne, Witold Gombrowicz, and Balthus. Ivry has written about the arts for a variety of periodicals including The New York Observer, The New York Sun, New England Review, The Economist, The Wall Street Journal, Newsweek, Time, New Statesman, The New York Times, Bloomberg.com, and The Washington Post.

Selected bibliography

Biographies
Francis Poulenc, 1996, Phaidon, 
Arthur Rimbaud, 1998, Absolute Press, 
Maurice Ravel: a Life, 2000, Welcome Rain, translated into Japanese by Shun Ishihara as *Mōrisu raveru: aru shōgai, 2002, Arufabēta,

Poetry
Paradise for the Portuguese Queen: Poems by Benjamin Ivry, 1998, Orchises Press,

Nonfiction
Regatta: a Celebration of The Art of Oarsmanship, 1988, Simon and Schuster, 
Sighing For The Silvery Moon: English Music Hall Songs Reexamined, 2022, Wolke Verlag, 
Parlez-moi d’amour: Themes in French Popular Song from the Commune to World War II, 2023, Wolke Verlag,

Translations
Without End: New and Selected Poems by Adam Zagajewski, translated by Benjamin Ivry with Renata Gorczynski and Clare Cavanagh, 2002, Farrar, Straus & Giroux, 
Magellania by Jules Verne, translated by Benjamin Ivry, 2002, Welcome Rain Publishers, 
Judge Not by André Gide, translated by Benjamin Ivry, 2003, University of Illinois Press, 
Vanished Splendors, a Memoir by Balthus, translated by Benjamin Ivry, 2003, Ecco Press, 
Mon Docteur, Le Vin (My Doctor, Wine) by Gaston Derys with Watercolors by Raoul Dufy, translated by Benjamin Ivry, 2003, Yale University Press, 
A Guide to Philosophy in Six Hours and Fifteen Minutes, by Witold Gombrowicz, translated by Benjamin Ivry, 2007, Yale University Press, 
At Home with André and Simone Weil, by Sylvie Weil, translated by Benjamin Ivry, 2010, Northwestern University Press, 
Chinese Piano: or Dueling over a Recital, by Étienne Barilier, translated by Benjamin Ivry, 2015, Verlag Traugott Bautz GmbH, 
Clepsydra: Essay on the Plurality of Time in Judaism, by Sylvie Anne Goldberg, translated by Benjamin Ivry, 2016, Stanford University Press, 
Transmitting Jewish History: In Conversation with Sylvie Anne Goldberg, by Yosef Hayim Yerushalmi, translated by Benjamin Ivry, 2021, Brandeis University Press,

Book chapters, prefaces, editions
The Trouble with Being Born, by E. M. Cioran, translated by Richard Howard, preface by Benjamin Ivry, 1993, Quartet Books, 
Entretiens, by E. M. Cioran, chapter by Benjamin Ivry, 1995, Gallimard Publishers, 
Love & Folly: Selected Fables and Tales of La Fontaine, by Jean de La Fontaine, translated by Marie Ponsot, edited and prefaced by Benjamin Ivry, 2002, Welcome Rain Publishers, 
American Writers: a Collection of literary biographies. Supplement XIV, Cleanth Brooks to Logan Pearsall Smith, edited by Jay Parini, essay on Logan Pearsall Smith by Benjamin Ivry, 2004, Charles Scribner's Sons, 
British Writers Supplement X, edited by Jay Parini, essay on Norman Douglas by Benjamin Ivry, 2004, Charles Scribner's Sons, 
The Oxford Encyclopaedia of American Literature, edited by Jay Parini, essay on Herman Melville by Benjamin Ivry, 2004, Oxford University Press, 
The Oxford Encyclopaedia of American Literature, edited by Jay Parini, essay on Richard Howard by Benjamin Ivry, 2004, Oxford University Press, 
King Solomon's Mines, by H. Rider Haggard, preface by Benjamin Ivry, 2004, Barnes & Noble Classics, 
American Writers : a Collection of Literary Biographies. Supplement XVI, John James Audubon to Gustaf Sobin, edited by Jay Parini, essay on Anita Loos by Benjamin Ivry, 2007, Charles Scribner's Sons, 
British Writers . Supplement XVI, edited by Jay Parini, essay on Thomas Campion by Benjamin Ivry, 2010, Charles Scribner's Sons, 
American Writers: Supplement XX, a Collection of Literary Biographies, edited by Jay Parini, essay on Howard Overing Sturgis by Benjamin Ivry, 2010, Charles Scribner's Sons,

External links
poems and translations published in The New Yorker
poems in  The Evergreen Review
articles in the New York Sun
articles in the New York Observer
articles in The Forward Newspaper
contributions to the Horizon section of Commentary Magazine
Alan Riding, 'The Secret Pan', Review of Maurice Ravel: A Life, The New York Times, December 3, 2000.
Jori Finkel, 'Like a Prayer: The Naked Ambition of Balthus', Review of Vanished Splendors, a Memoir by Balthus, Village Voice, January 15–21, 2003.
Louis Begley, 'The Late, Great Bard of Warsaw', Review of A Guide to Philosophy in Six Hours and Fifteen Minutes, The Washington Post, December 19, 2004.
Peter Monaghan, 'Mystic and Mysterious', Review of At Home With André and Simone Weil, The Chronicle of Higher Education, October 20, 2010.
Piers Paul Read, 'A bitter legacy', Review of At Home With André and Simone Weil, The Spectator, January 8, 2011.

English-language poets
American male poets
American translators
American male journalists
American biographers
American male biographers
Living people
French–English translators
20th-century American poets
21st-century American non-fiction writers
20th-century American male writers
20th-century American non-fiction writers
Year of birth missing (living people)
21st-century American male writers
Ravel scholars